Erakah is a New Zealand R&B and soul singer. In 2009, she featured on R&B singer J.Williams single "Your Style" of his album Young Love.
Inspired by Soul music Erakah states Alicia Keys, Lily Allen, Beyoncé and Brandy as influences on her musical style.
She released her debut album, Infatuated, on 21 March 2011. Erakah is now a regular backup singer for Stan Walker. In 2011, she performed at Mika's Aroha Mardi Gras TV Special.

Discography

Studio albums

Singles

Featured singles

Music videos

Awards and nominations
Pacific Music Awards

|-
|2010
|"Wonderful"
|Best Pacific Female Artist
|

References

Year of birth missing (living people)
Living people
21st-century New Zealand women singers
New Zealand contemporary R&B singers